Legally Brown was an Australian comedy television series screened on SBS from 2013 to 2014. It presented a take on being Muslim in Australia.

The ten-part series was hosted and co-written by Nazeem Hussain and produced by Johnny Lowry. It featured stand-up in front of a live studio audience, with pre-recorded scripted sketches and character and hidden camera stunts.

Cast
 Nazeem Hussain as himself, Imran Farook and other roles
 Mohammed El-Leissy as Mohamed
 Alice Ansara as Lamees and other roles
 Luke McGregor
 Matt Okine
 Laura Hughes as Maymoona and other roles
 Ronny Chieng

References

External links 

2013 Australian television series debuts
2014 Australian television series endings
Australian television sketch shows
Special Broadcasting Service original programming